Alejandro Bermúdez Tamayo (born March 30, 1975) is a retired backstroke and medley swimmer from Colombia. He competed in three consecutive Summer Olympics for his native country, starting in 1992. His best result was 13th place in the Men's 400 metres Individual Medley at the 1996 Summer Olympics in Atlanta, Georgia.

At the 1992 Summer Olympics in Barcelona, Bermúdez finished 25th in the 1500-meter freestyle, 26th in the 200-meter backstroke, 27th in the 400-meter individual medley, and 35th in the 400-meter freestyle. At the 1995 Pan American Games in Mar del Plata, he finished 4th in the 400-meter freestyle, 4th in the 400-meter individual medley, and 8th in the 200-meter freestyle. At the 1996 Summer Olympics in Atlanta, Bermúdez finished 13th in the 400-meter individual medley, and 21st in the 400-meter freestyle. At the 2000 Summer Olympics in Sydney, Bermúdez finished 28th in the 200-meter backstroke, and 35th in the 400-meter individual medley.

References

1975 births
Living people
Male backstroke swimmers
Male medley swimmers
Colombian male swimmers
Olympic swimmers of Colombia
Swimmers at the 1992 Summer Olympics
Swimmers at the 1995 Pan American Games
Swimmers at the 1996 Summer Olympics
Swimmers at the 1999 Pan American Games
Swimmers at the 2000 Summer Olympics
Place of birth missing (living people)
Pan American Games competitors for Colombia
Central American and Caribbean Games gold medalists for Colombia
Central American and Caribbean Games silver medalists for Colombia
Central American and Caribbean Games bronze medalists for Colombia
Competitors at the 1993 Central American and Caribbean Games
Competitors at the 1998 Central American and Caribbean Games
Central American and Caribbean Games medalists in swimming
20th-century Colombian people